Pablo de la Torriente Brau (San Juan de Puerto Rico, December 12, 1901 – Majadahonda, near Madrid, Spain, December 19, 1936) was a Cuban writer, journalist and soldier.

He was a correspondent in Spain, writing for the Mexican newspaper El Machete. He fought for the Republic and against Francisco Franco's forces in the Spanish Civil War, and died in combat, while fighting in Majadahonda city during the defense of Madrid.

He was married to the Cuban writer, actress and activist Teresa Casuso Marín.

Aventuras de un soldado desconocido cubano ("Adventures of an Unknown Cuban Soldier") was published after his death (1940).

External links
Cultural Center in Havana, named after him 

ì

1901 births
1936 deaths
Cuban journalists
Male journalists
Military personnel killed in the Spanish Civil War
Abraham Lincoln Brigade members
Cuban non-fiction writers
Cuban male writers
20th-century journalists
Cuban expatriates in Puerto Rico
Cuban expatriates in Spain